William Mullen may refer to:

 Billy Mullen (1896–1971), baseball player
 William Mullen (journalist) (born 1944), American editor and correspondent
 William F. Mullen III, United States Marine Corps general

See also
 William Mullan (1928–2018), Scottish football referee
 Williams Mullen, U.S. law firm